The University of Saint Francis (USF) is a private Catholic university in Fort Wayne, Indiana. The university promotes Catholic and Franciscan values. The school's 2017–18 enrollment was 2,364 undergraduate and graduate students, the majority of whom come from states in the Midwest, primarily Indiana, Michigan, Illinois, and Ohio.

History
The University of Saint Francis was founded in Lafayette, Indiana, in 1890, when the Sisters of St. Francis of Perpetual Adoration founded Saint Francis Normal School, a teacher training school, to provide better training for members of the congregation teaching in parochial schools. It operated as a junior college until 1937, when it became a four-year school. The school became Saint Francis College in 1940. 

The college moved to its current Fort Wayne location in 1944, to the estate of the former industrialist John H. Bass. Trinity Hall was completed in 1947. The school has remained in Fort Wayne and gradually expanded, adding a graduate school in 1960. Increased athletic programs for the Cougars, primarily football, as well as construction of athletic fields and residence halls and acquisition of the Lutheran College of Health Professions in the 1990s produced remarkable enrollment growth. It was renamed University of Saint Francis in 1998.

Campus

Brookside Mansion

Brookside Mansion, a castle-like mansion that was originally the home of the John H. Bass family, is a focal point of the university and is listed on the National Register of Historic Places. The building originally housed the entire college, and has served as the university's library, as well as dorms and a dining area. The mansion is now primarily used for offices, although special events and meetings often take place in the building as well. In 2009, the building was renovated, including interior and exterior touch-ups of the original artwork and design.

Pope John Paul II Center
The Pope John Paul II Center is also a main place of activity at the university. Completed in 2006, the building houses the Lee and Jim Vann Library, Registrar's Office, faculty offices, the Campus Shoppe, and classrooms.

The Mimi and Ian Rolland Art and Visual Communication Center
In the summer of 1998, the university purchased the former property of the Standard Oil warehouse, which had become polluted with oil residue. In the spring of 1999, the university—with a grant from the City of Fort Wayne and the State of Indiana—cleaned the ground, water, and surrounding area.

Satellite facilities

Academics

The university comprises the following schools:
 School of Creative Arts
 School of Health Sciences
 School of Liberal Arts and Sciences
 Keith Busse School of Business and Entrepreneurial Leadership

The School of Creative Arts is accredited by the National Association of Schools of Art and Design.

EPIC Program 
The Busse EPIC programs give students the opportunity to earn 2+ years of paid, for-credit work experience and graduate in 4 years. EPIC students spend 4-6 month rotations in each of the key functional areas of successful businesses while taking a reduced course load.

Athletics

The Saint Francis (USF) athletic teams are called the Cougars. The university is a member of the National Association of Intercollegiate Athletics (NAIA), primarily competing in the Crossroads League (formerly known as the Mid-Central College Conference (MCCC) until after the 2011–12 school year) for most of its sports since the 1994–95 academic year (which they were a member on a previous stint from 1966–67 to 1980–81); while its football team competes in the Mideast League of the Mid-States Football Association (MSFA).

USF competes in 19 intercollegiate varsity sports: Men's sports include baseball, basketball, cross country, football, golf, soccer, tennis and track & field; while women's sports include basketball, cross country, golf, soccer, softball, tennis, track & field and volleyball; and co-ed sports include cheerleading, crew and eSports.

Notable alumni
Tom Henry, B.A., M.B.A, 35th mayor of Fort Wayne, Indiana
Steve Yoder, M.S.E., 1970, men's basketball coach at Ball State University from 1977 to 1982
James Bettcher,
Career NFL Football Coach
https://en.m.wikipedia.org/wiki/James_Bettcher

References

External links
 
 Official athletics website

 
Franciscan universities and colleges
Catholic universities and colleges in Indiana
Buildings and structures in Fort Wayne, Indiana
Education in Fort Wayne, Indiana
Association of Catholic Colleges and Universities
Roman Catholic Diocese of Fort Wayne–South Bend
Educational institutions established in 1890
1890 establishments in Indiana
Tourist attractions in Fort Wayne, Indiana